Carlin may refer to:

People
 Carlin (name), including a list of people with the name

Places
 4121 Carlin, a main belt asteroid
 Carlin, Nevada, United States
 Carlin How, a village in northern England, UK
 Carlin Precinct, Calhoun County, Illinois, USA
 Carlin Tunnel, in Elko County, Nevada, USA
 Carlin Unconformity, a geological feature in Nevada notable as a gold mining area
 Delcambre Canal, in the U.S. state of Louisiana, also known as Bayou Carlin

Other uses
 Carlin Act, legislation in the United States
 Carlin America, an independent music publishing conglomerate
 Carlin Motorsport, a motor racing team in the United Kingdom
 Carlin stone, in Scotland
 Pug, a breed of dog (also known as Carlin)

See also

 
 Charlene (disambiguation)
 Charlin (disambiguation)
 Carling (disambiguation)
 Karlin (disambiguation)
 Carline (name)
 Carly (name), a feminine form of the given name Carlin